TMEM260 is a protein that in humans is encoded by the TMEM260 gene. The function of TMEM260 is not yet clearly understood.    TMEM260 is also known as UPF0679, c14orf101, and FLJ0392.

Gene

Location 

TMEM260 is located on band 22.3 on the small arm of human chromosome 14.  The genomic sequence begins at 56,955,072 bp and ends at 57,117,324 bp on chromosome 14.  The gene's genomic size is 162,253 bp.  The mRNA size for TMEM260 is 4,278 bp. and made up of 15 exons.

Gene neighborhood 
There are four other genes in the neighborhood of TMEM260.  Two genes lie upstream of  TMEM260, including LINC00520, which is the long intergenic non-protein coding RNA gene 520 gene, and PELI2 which is the pellino E3 ubiquitin protein ligase family member 2 gene.  Downstream lies one pseudogene, RPL36AP1, and a gene OTX2, which is the orthodenticle homeobox 2 gene.

Conserved domains 
TMEM260 contains one conserved domain, DUF2723.  The domain DUF2723 is conserved back to bacteria and its function is not known.

Homology 
TMEM260 is conserved throughout many species.  Orthologs can be found throughout all Eukaryotes, Viridiplantae, Fungi, Protists, Bacteria and Eubacteria. No paralogs have yet been found.

Isoforms 
There are two known isoforms for TMEM260 which produced by alternative splicing. Their uniprot IDs are Q9NX78-1 and Q9NX78-2. Isoform 1 consists of all 707 amino acids in the entire protein sequence, which is made up of 15 exons.  Isoform 2 is spliced at amino acid 286 with the 3’ end truncated so that it contains only the first 7 exons in the sequence.  It weighs only 30,707 Da.

Protein

General properties 

The protein TMEM260 consists of 707 amino acids with a predicted molecular weight of 79,536 Da.  The protein has an isoelectric point of 8.4.  TMEM260 is a multi-pass membrane protein which includes 8 helical transmembrane domains.

Conservation 
The amino acid sequence for TMEM260 is highly conserved in mammals, having around 86% to 100% sequence similarity.  Birds, frogs, and lizards also have a high degree of similarity to the human TMEM260 sequence with similarities between 76% and 83%.  Fish have between 56% and 66% sequence similarity.  Algae have around 52% sequence similarity while diatoms have only 39%.  Though mammals contain a very high degree of sequence similarity and other animals show a fairly high degree of sequence similarity, other species such as algae, diatoms, and bacteria have gaps and 3’ end truncations.  The segment of the TMEM260 sequence that is highly conserved in organisms as far back as algae, diatoms, and bacteria is the conserved domain DUF2723.

Post translation modifications 
The TMEM260 protein undergoes several different kinds of post translational modifications.  These include N-terminal Acetylation, N-Glycosylation, and Phosphorylation.

References

Genes on human chromosome 14